Francis Whately is a British television producer, director and series director who started his career in 1998 and worked for BBC for over 20 years. The documentary films he directed were mainly about music. He produced David Bowie: Finding Fame (2019), David Bowie: The Last Five Years (2017), Rock ‘n’ Roll Guns for Hire: The Story of the Sidemen (2017), Judi Dench: All the World’s Her Stage (2016), Kim Philby – His Most Intimate Betrayal (2014), David Bowie: Five Years (2013).

Filmography

Accolades 
FOCAL Archive Award for David Bowie Five Years (2014.06)

BAFTA for David Bowie Five Years (2014.04)

BAFTA for the series Andrew Marr's 'History of Modern Britain' (the third director) (2007.05)

Major works 
David Bowie: Five Years (2013)

This documentary focuses on five key years in David Bowie’s career: 1971–1972, 1974–1975, 1976–1977, 1979–1980, 1982–1983. It comments on Bowie's change of image, from Ziggy Stardust to the Soul Star of Young Americans, to "The Thin White Duke", using archive material.

David Bowie: The Last Five years (2017)

The documentary has continued the previous method of presenting David Bowie’ s life by interviewing others. This documentary was broadcast a year after Bowie’ s death and is also receiving widespread attention. Instead of interviewing Bowie’ s friends and family about Bowie’ s heart attack and later cancer diagnosis, Francis Whately interviewed the musicians who have cooperate with David Bowie in his last two albums (Blackstar and The Next Day) and the New York musical Lazarus. This documentary has showed Bowie’ s innovation in the last five years of his life after nearly a decade of silence.

Rock ‘n’ Roll Guns for Hire: The Story of the Sidemen (2017)

The documentary mainly focused on the musicians who work behind some of the greatest artists such as Prince, David Bowie, The Rolling Stones and Beyoncé and make contribution to change musical history. Those musicians, called ‘Guns for Hire’ in the documentary, are the people who play at live shows and often even contribute to recordings as songwriters or session musicians.

Judi Dench: All the World’s Her Stage (2016)

The documentary has looked back over Judi Dench, one of Britain's greatest actors’ s remarkable 60-year career. Unlike other documentaries, this one has showed Judi’ life in a never known, a new angle.

Stories behind 
1) Francis Whately posted a David Bowie poster on the wall of his home when he was a teenager, and described Bowie as his hero in a series of subsequent interviews. The first meeting of Whately and Bowie was in 1998, Whately was just finished 100 Works, an episode of British sculpture, and Bowie has contributed his voices and words in this short film. Before that time, Whately and Bowie were conducted by telephone and letters. Whately was very nervous and excited about seeing his hero, but Bowie's courteous and polite made the conversation more comfortable. After that, Whately and Bowie kept in touch for a long time until Bowie died.

2) Bowie and Whately formed a good relationship. Although they rarely talk about music, they are interested in many of the same things, they often discuss the books and arts that they admired. In the 1990s, Bowie was often make phone call with Whately. At that time, Bowie was writing for an art magazine, Whately did lots of art films and was very interested in contemporary arts, they always had common interest to talk about.

3) Although the two documentaries, David Bowie: Five Years and David Bowie: The Last Five Years both have recorded the interviews from others, the themes and shooting methods are quite different. The first one was basic on David Bowie’ s request, instead of making a conventional biography about him being born and going through his life chronologically, director has used more contemporary editing and collage to show the most important five years in Bowie’ life. While during filming David Bowie: The Last Five Years, Bowie was very care about his privacy and didn't gave Whately chance to interview him along. So there's no interview videos of Bowie’ s last five years in this documentary. Whately interviewed the musicians who have cooperated with Bowie in his last two albums: Blackstar and The Next Day and interviewed them in the Jazz Bar 55° which located in New York center. By representing the nervous and secret recording process from the musicians’ perspective, the film has show Bowie’ s enthusiasm on music.

4) The director himself thinks that the difference between the two documentaries is that in the first one he wanted to show to audience is the changeable of Bowie, while the second one was not focus on how much he changed, but his unchangeable, his enthusiasm on music.

5) David Bowie: The Last Five Years was on the air on HBO on January 8, 2017, which would have been David Bowie' s 71st birthday.

References

External links

British television producers
Year of birth missing (living people)
Living people